The Doral Open was a professional golf tournament on the PGA Tour in the southeastern United States. It was played annually for 45 seasons, from 1962 to 2006, on the "Blue Monster" course at the Doral Golf Resort & Spa in Doral, Florida, a suburb west of Miami.

The introduction of the FedEx Cup in 2007 caused a change in the PGA Tour schedule. The WGC-CA Championship, a World Golf Championship event co-sponsored by the PGA Tour, moved from October to March and took the Doral Open's spot on the schedule. This championship was also held at the Blue Monster course for the next decade; it was renamed the WGC-Cadillac Championship in 2011 and continued at Doral through 2016. The resort was sold in 2012 and became Trump National Doral Miami. The PGA Tour Latinoamérica development tour will host the season-ending Shell Championship in December 2018 on the Golden Palm course to continue the PGA Tour's tradition of hosting at Doral.

History
The tournament was played at various points in March, and sometimes in late February. Both the tournament's title and sponsor changed over the years, and included Ford Motor Company, Genuity, Ryder, and Eastern Air Lines. The Doral Golf Resort & Spa was formerly known as the Doral Country Club and was the sister hotel to the famous Doral Hotel on the ocean in Miami Beach, Florida.

The tournament usually attracted one of the strongest fields on the PGA Tour outside of the major championships and the World Golf Championships. The champions at Doral include major winners Jack Nicklaus, Tom Weiskopf, Lee Trevino, Billy Casper, Raymond Floyd, Greg Norman, Hubert Green, Ben Crenshaw, Lanny Wadkins, Tom Kite, Nick Faldo, Ernie Els, Jim Furyk, and Tiger Woods.

In 2005, nine of the top ten players in the official world rankings participated. After an exciting final round duel with then-World Number 4 Phil Mickelson, Tiger Woods won by a shot to regain the number one ranking he had lost six months earlier to Vijay Singh, who finished in a tie for third.

The 2006 Ford Championship at Doral marked the end of the Doral Open tournament and the field again included nine of the top ten in the world rankings. Woods repeated as champion, one-stroke ahead of runners-up Camilo Villegas and David Toms.

The historical broadcaster of the event was CBS Sports.  With the PGA Tour's first centralized TV deal in 1999, the Southern Swing, including Doral, was assigned to NBC Sports.  NBC covered the event until its conclusion as a regular event, and continued for its ten years as a World Golf Championship.

Tournament highlights
1962: Billy Casper down by four shots with eight holes to go, comes back to win the inaugural version of the tournament. He beats Pete Bondeson by one shot.
1964: Billy Casper becomes Doral's first repeat winner. He finishes one shot ahead of Jack Nicklaus.
1965: Doug Sanders, winner the week before at the Pensacola Open, comes out victorious at Doral for the first time. He beats Bruce Devlin by one shot.
1969: Tom Shaw holds on to win his first ever PGA Tour title by one shot over Tommy Aaron in spite of making both a triple bogey and a double bogey during the tournament's final nine holes.
1973: Lee Trevino shoots a first round 64 on his way to a wire to wire victory. He finishes one shot ahead of Bruce Crampton and Tom Weiskopf. 
1976: Hubert Green shoots a tournament record 270 for 72 holes on his way to a six-shot win over Mark Hayes and Jack Nicklaus.
1977: Andy Bean takes home his first Doral title on his 24th birthday. He edges David Graham by one shot. 
1978: Previously a three-time runner-up at Doral, Tom Weiskopf wins by one shot over Jack Nicklaus in spite of a final round 65 by the Golden Bear that included his holing out three wedge shots during the tournament's closing 18 holes.
1979: Monday morning qualifier Mark McCumber wins by one shot over Bill Rogers.
1980: Doral for the first time ever goes to sudden death to determine the winner. On the second playoff hole, Raymond Floyd chips in from just off the green to beat Jack Nicklaus.
1981: Raymond Floyd becomes the first Doral champion to successfully defend his title. He wins by one shot over Keith Fergus and David Graham.
1986: Andy Bean defeats Hubert Green on the fourth hole of a sudden death playoff to become Doral's first three-time winner.
1988: Ben Crenshaw birdies the 72nd hole to win by one shot over Chip Beck and Mark McCumber.
1990: Greg Norman shoots a final round 62. Then on the first hole of a sudden death playoff with Tim Simpson, Mark Calcavecchia, and Paul Azinger, he chips in for eagle to take home the title.
1993: Greg Norman sets a new Doral record for 72 holes of 265 on his way to four stroke victory over Paul Azinger and Mark McCumber.
1994: John Huston, playing most of the final 18 holes by himself after his player partner Fred Couples withdraws due to injury, wins by three shots over Brad Bryant and Billy Andrade.
1999: Steve Elkington shoots a final round 64 to earn his second win at Doral. He edges Greg Kraft by one shot. 
2004: On the first hole of a sudden death playoff with Scott Verplank, Craig Parry wins by holing out a 7-iron from 176 yards.
2006: In spite of bogeying the final two holes, Tiger Woods holds on to win Doral for the second consecutive year. He finishes one shot ahead of David Toms and Camilo Villegas.

Winners

Multiple winners
Nine men won this tournament more than once.
3 wins
Andy Bean: 1977, 1982, 1986
Raymond Floyd: 1980, 1981, 1992
Greg Norman: 1990, 1993, 1996
2 wins
Billy Casper: 1962, 1964
Doug Sanders: 1965, 1967
Jack Nicklaus: 1972, 1975
Mark McCumber: 1979, 1985
Steve Elkington: 1997, 1999
Tiger Woods: 2005, 2006

References

External links
Doral Open results from 1970 to 2006 – Winners, Finishers, Scores and Earnings
PGA Tour's tournament site
Trump National Doral Golf Club

Former PGA Tour events
Golf in Florida
Sports competitions in Florida
Sports competitions in Miami
Doral, Florida
Recurring sporting events established in 1962
Recurring sporting events disestablished in 2006
1962 establishments in Florida
2006 disestablishments in Florida